Deniss Rakeļs (born 20 August 1992) is a Latvian professional footballer who plays for the Latvia national team. He was born in Jēkabpils.

Career

Club

Early career in Latvia
Rakels started his youth career in his local club Jēkabpils RSS, later on moving to another club from the same city - Jēkabpils SC. In 2007, he left, signing for FK Liepājas Metalurgs-2 in the Latvian First League. While playing for the reserve team of Metalurgs, he was an outstanding team leader - he scored regularly and was impressive with his speed to finish the through balls. In 2009, only 17 years old, he was taken to the first team by that time Metalurgs manager Rüdiger Abramczik. He had no difficulties to fit into the first team level soon after joining, becoming a regular first eleven player. Even more - he scored in nearly every appearance. In fact, just after a few appearances Rakels had already completed 2 league hat-tricks. His technique and footballing skills impressed many coaches all around the world, despite him being just 18. In December 2009 he went on trial with the Italian Serie A side Sampdoria. In April 2010 he joined Swiss Super League team Basel on trial, and in August 2010 in a league game against FK Ventspils he was scouted by Werder Bremen scouts.

Zagłębie Lubin
In December 2010 it was announced that Rakels would go on a training camp together with the Russian Premier League giants Rubin Kazan in January 2011, but the player himself decided to reject the offer, because the Polish Ekstraklasa club Zagłębie Lubin were interested in signing him. This scenario turned out to be true and on 30 January 2011, after passing medical tests, Rakels signed a three-year contract with them. Later on the player himself admitted that till the very last day before signing a contract with Zagłębie the representatives of the Ukrainian Premier League club Karpaty Lviv had been trying to persuade him to join their club, despite several previous refusals from the player.

GKS Katowice
On 17 August 2011 Rakels was sent on a season long loan spell to Polish I liga club GKS Katowice to gain experience due to his limited game time in Lubin. He scored 5 goals in 20 matches for the club, returning to Zagłębie after the season. It was reported that Rakels would be loaned to GKS for another season in August 2012. In his second season with GKS Rakels scored 11 goals in 27 matches, becoming one of the league's top scorers. In July 2013 he went on trial with the English Football League Championship club Brighton & Hove Albion, but did not stay with them, despite scoring a goal in a pre-season friendly match. Before the start of the 2013–14 Ekstraklasa season Rakels returned to Zagłębie Lubin.

Cracovia
On 15 January 2014 Rakels decided to sign a half-year contract with Cracovia, the contract was later extended.

Reading
On 28 January 2016 Rakels signed a two-and-a-half-year deal with Reading for an undisclosed fee. Rakels made his Reading debut on 6 February 2016, coming on as a 79th-minute substitute for Matěj Vydra, in their 0–0 draw with Wolverhampton Wanderers. He scored his first goal for Reading when he struck a late winner in a 4–3 win at Charlton Athletic on 27 February 2016.

Rakels was stretchered off during Reading's EFL Cup second round match against Milton Keynes Dons on 23 August 2016 with a suspected fractured ankle. This Injury kept Rakels out of first team football for the remainder of the 2016–17 season, making only a handful of Under-23 appearances.

Rakels was released by Reading at the end of his contract on 30 June 2018.

Lech Poznań (loan)
On 16 June 2017, Rakels underwent a medical with Lech Poznań ahead of a season-long loan deal. 10 days later, on 26 June 2017, Reading confirmed that Rakels had joined Lech Poznań on a season-long loan deal.

Cracovia (loan)
On 17 January 2018, Reading confirmed that Rakels' loan deal with Lech Poznań had ended, and that Rakels had joined Cracovia on loan for the remainder of the season.

Pafos FC
On 16 July 2018, Rakels signed for Cypriot First Division club Pafos FC, and then immediately joined Latvian Higher League club Riga FC on loan.

FK RFS
On 2 July 2021, Rakels signed for FK RFS on an 18-month contract.

International
Rakels was a member of Latvia U-19 and Latvia U-21 football teams. In June 2010 he was firstly called up to the Latvia national football team for the 2010 Baltic Cup by the manager Aleksandrs Starkovs, who was impressed by the youngster's great form in the national championship. He made his international debut on 18 June 2010 in a 0–0 draw against Lithuania, coming on as a substitute in the 75th minute and replacing Andrejs Perepļotkins.

Career statistics

Club

International

Statistics accurate as of match played 10 October 2019

International goals
Scores and results list Latvia's goal tally first.

Honours
Liepājas Metalurgs
 Virslīga (1): 2009
 Virslīga top-scorer (1): 2010

Personal life
Rakels is of Polish descent. He has many tattoos on his body, they include his name, his mother's name, and a wish for his parents written in Arabic.

References

External links
 
 
 

1992 births
Living people
People from Jēkabpils
Latvian footballers
Latvian people of Polish descent
FK Liepājas Metalurgs players
Zagłębie Lubin players
GKS Katowice players
MKS Cracovia (football) players
Lech Poznań players
Latvia international footballers
Latvian expatriate footballers
Latvian expatriate sportspeople in Poland
Latvian expatriate sportspeople in England
Expatriate footballers in Poland
Ekstraklasa players
Reading F.C. players
Association football forwards
Latvian expatriate sportspeople in Cyprus